Zoe Tavarelli (born January 3, 1996) is an Italian film and television actress.

Filmography

Film

Television

Awards and nominations
2008 Piemonte Movie Award for Best Leading Actress – Piedi Nudi; Won
2018 LA shorts awards Bronze Award – Diminuendo; Won

References

External links
 
 Instagram

Italian film actresses
Italian television actresses
Expatriate actresses in the United States
1996 births
21st-century Italian actresses
Italian child actresses
Living people